The 1978–79 I-Divisioona season was the fifth season of the I-Divisioona, the second level of Finnish ice hockey. 10 teams participated in the league, and SaiPa Lapeenranta won the championship. SaiPa Lappeenranta and FoPS Forssa qualified for the promotion/relegation round of the SM-liiga.

Regular season

External links
 Season on hockeyarchives.info

I-Divisioona seasons
2
Fin